Photography in China dates back to the mid-19th century with the arrival of European photographers in Macao. In the 1850s, western photographers set up studios in the coastal port cities, but soon their Chinese assistants and local competition spread to all regions.

By the end of the 19th century, all major cities had photographic studios where middle-class Chinese could have portraits taken for family occasions. Western and Chinese photographers documented ordinary street life, major wars, and prominent figures. Affluent Chinese adopted photography as a hobby; Empress Dowager Cixi had her portrait taken repeatedly. In the 20th century, photography in China—as in other countries around the world—was used for recreation, record keeping, newspaper and magazine journalism, political propaganda, and fine-art photography.

Overview
According to the scholar Meccarelli, Chinese photography is the result of several factors. These include the study of optics (invention of camera obscura), the development of modern chemistry (photosensitive substances), the diffusion and settlement of Western medicine (especially anatomy), the presence of Westerners and missionaries (know-how and use of the photographic tool)  Photographers were interested not only in recording what they saw, but also in using new techniques to express traditional aesthetics and poetics.

History

1842–1890: Pioneers 

Some of the very early photographers in China include Dr Richard Woosnam, Major George Malcolm, Henry Collen, Jules Itier and Zou Boqi.

In the second half of the 19th century, some Chinese photo studios were established, such as Kung Tai (公泰照相樓) and Sze Yuen Ming (上洋耀華照相) in Shanghai, and Pun Lun (繽綸) and Lai Afong (赖阿芳) in Hong Kong. Major contributions in this would come from George R. West and Hugh Mackay.

Several pioneers of photography in China include Felice Beato (British, 1832–1909), John Thomson (British, 1837–1921) and Afong Lai (Chinese, 1839–1900).

Early 20th century 
Several well-known photographers of the early 20th century include Liu Bannong (1891–1934, 劉半農) and Zhang Yin Quan (1900–1971, 張印泉). Some photographers of this period branched into filmmaking such as Ho Fan (1937–2016, 何藩) and China's first steps into photojournalism done by Lang Jingshan (1892–1995). During the wars and instability of the warlords period, some photographers like Gao Fan (1922–2004) ventured into wartime photography, as did Niu Weiyu (1922–), the latter would also take many photographs for the Chinese Communist Party leaders. The later war (Second Sino-Japanese War, 1937–1945) would be much covered by Sha Fei (1912–1948).

Early Communist rule: 1949–1965 
In the early years of the People's Republic, the state organized artists and writers into official groups that directed their work and provided them with steady salaries. Accordingly, many were assigned to photographers of Mao and high Party members. Among these were Hou Bo, Lu Houmin, and Xu Xiaobing.

Cultural Revolution: 1966–1976 
Photography in China was seen as a Socialist Realist propagandist tool. Li Zhensheng was one of the few photographers who managed to take pictures in an honest way during the Cultural Revolution. Subjects of his Cultural Revolution photographs included "negative" scenes such public humiliation, street violence, executions, etc., as well as "positive" moments, like people studying Mao's works, singing revolutionary slogans, performing loyalty dance, and participating in farm work, etc. Li's photographs of the Cultural Revolution are published in a book titled "Red-Color News Soldier" by Phaidon.

Modern: 1976–1993 
The April Fifth Movement in 1976 marked the start of a new photographic vision in China. During the movement, ordinary citizens (amateur photographers) picked up the cameras and documented people's public mourning for Chinese Premier Zhou Enlai in Tiananmen Square in Beijing. A couple of years later, some of these photographs were published in a book called "People's Mourning". Many of these amateur photographers became professional ones and joined the official press. They also found an unofficial photo club called "April Photo Society."

The aftermath of the Cultural Revolution led to a documentary photography movement that rapidly grew in strength.  Many photojournalists worked for the state, and therefore they do not own their copyright in their work.

Contemporary: 1993–present 
The establishment in 1993 of the East Village area of the capital Beijing, established an artistic coterie that used photography as an adjunct to experimental performance art and conceptual art.  In 1994, Rong Rong co-founded the first Chinese conceptual art photography magazine, New Photo.

Many artist-photographers have had success, especially in the west. Although their work has not been as explicitly political as that by very similar conceptual artists in the west, it has used the same repertoire of 'shock'; nakedness, swear words, dead babies and elephant dung, among other items that have now become tired clichés. Some photographers also work in 'Chinese kitsch' – sometimes called "Mao goes Pop" – a collage style very similar to western pop art of the 1960s.  Presently, we are reminded of the discursive autonomy contemporary Chinese art is increasingly afforded, seen in works by artists such as Xu Zhen, Xing Danwen, and Zhang Yue – artists who can not be easily summarized under the umbrella of a single artistic praxis such as "kitsch" or "pop" or "shock."

Chinese magazines for photography
Chinese Photography (中國攝影, Peking) publishing as of 1957
Popular Photography (大众攝影 (大衆攝影), Peking) publishing as of 1958

See also

 Felice Beato
 Henri Cartier-Bresson
 Robert Capa
 China Lucky Film
 Auguste François
 Hakuyō Fuchikami
 Greg Girard
 Tadahiko Hayashi
 Joris Ivens
 Hou Bo
 Li Zhensheng
 Liang Shitai
 Liu Xucang
 Lu Guang
 Ma Liuming
 Hedda Morrison
 Mu Qing
 Ou Ning
 Wang Qingsong
 Qiu Zhijie
 Eva Sandberg
 Marc Riboud
 Pierre Rossier
 William Saunders (photographer)
 John Thomson (photographer)
 Xia Xiao Wan
 Xu Xiaobing
 Yip Cheong Fun
 Zheng Guogu
 Zhang Ou
 Zhou Chengzhou

References

Further reading
 Naomi Rosenblum, A World History of Photography
 Brush & Shutter: Early Photography in China, 2011, Getty Publications/Hong Kong University Press,

External links
 
 chinese-photography.net : a virtual exhibition of a private collection of Chinese contemporary photographs
 Bibliography of Materials related to Photography in China before 1949
 Shadows of the East, on the "Humanism in China" exhibition on Chinese Photography
 
 
"Action - Camera: Beijing Performance Photography". Morris and Helen Belkin Art Gallery
Bibliography of Photo-albums and Materials related to Photography in China and Tibet before 1949
中國摄影博物馆・中国最早的老照相馆考证及名录

 
Chinese art
Arts in China